Abel LeBlanc (born c. 1946) is a politician in the province of New Brunswick, Canada.  He was elected to the Legislative Assembly of New Brunswick in 2003.

He represented the electoral district of Saint John Lancaster as a Liberal.

LeBlanc was born in Saint John, New Brunswick, the son of Abel LeBlanc and Domitilde Gallant. He joined the Canadian Army and then went on to work at the Port of Saint John. On February 11, 2010, LeBlanc was expelled from the legislature following a verbal outburst, which included giving two Tory MLAs the finger.

In June 2014, the New Brunswick New Democratic Party announced LeBlanc had joined, and he ran as their candidate in his former riding for that year's provincial election, placing third.

References

External links
 MLA Bios, Government of New Brunswick

Living people
Canadian trade unionists
New Brunswick Liberal Association MLAs
Year of birth missing (living people)
Politicians from Saint John, New Brunswick
Acadian people
People expelled from public office
21st-century Canadian politicians